The Global Green Growth Institute (GGGI) is a treaty-based inter-governmental international development organization headquartered in Seoul, South Korea.  The organization promotes green growth, a growth paradigm that is characterized by a balance of economic growth and environmental sustainability. Global Green Growth Institute provides technical support, research opportunities, and stakeholder engagement for green growth plans, especially in developing countries.

The Global Green Growth Institute works across four priority areas, including energy, water, land-use planning, and green cities.

History 

GGGI was first launched as a think tank in 2010 by Korean President Lee Myung-bak, and was later converted into an international treaty-based organization in 2012 at the Rio+20 Summit in Brazil.

Work

The organization’s work is focused on a number of areas: 

- Greenhouse gas emission reduction 

- The creation of green jobs

- Its vision is to increase access to sustainable services such as clean affordable energy, sustainable public transport, improved sanitation, and sustainable waste management

- Its drive to improve air quality

- An adequate supply of ecosystem services

- Enhanced adaptation to climate change

Membership 

The  is a treaty-based organization, which requires potential members to ratify the Agreement on the Establishment of the Global Green Growth Institute to become a Party to the Agreement. Regional integration organizations can also become members of the Institute by ratifying the Agreement.

Member States 
The following are the Member States of the Institute:

Partner States 
The following are the Partner States of the Institute:

Currently in the process of accession to the Agreement

Partner Organisations 
The following are the Partner Organisations of the Institute:
  European Union
 Organisation of Eastern Caribbean States

Activities

Green growth plans in developing countries

GGGI has worked to provide research and develop green growth plans for sixteen developing countries: Brazil, Cambodia, China, Ethiopia, India, Indonesia, Kazakhstan, Mongolia, Morocco, Peru, Philippines, Rwanda, South Africa, Thailand, United Arab Emirates, and Vietnam. On June 27, 2014, (Nairobi), GGGI and the UN Environment Programme announced a new partnership to cooperate in promoting green growth strategies and action plans in countries around the world.

Green Growth Knowledge Platform

On January 11, 2012, a Memorandum of Understanding was signed between GGGI, the UNEP, OECD, and the World Bank to establish the Green Growth Knowledge Platform. This signing was followed by the inaugural Green Growth Knowledge Platform conference in Mexico City.

Relationship with other international bodies

United Nations General Assembly

In December 2013, GGGI was granted Observer Status by the United Nations General Assembly. The status gives GGGI the right to speak at General Assembly meetings and sponsor and sign resolutions. GGGI will also be able to cast procedural votes. Observers are not allowed to vote on resolutions.

United Nations Framework Convention on Climate Change

In November 2013, GGGI was granted status as an Intergovernmental Observer Organization to the United Nations Framework Convention on Climate Change (UNFCCC) at the Nineteenth Conference of Parties (COP) to the UNFCCC. In June 2015, GGGI and the UNFCCC signed a Memorandum of Understanding to work together on activities aimed at addressing green growth issues in developing countries, by fostering climate resilient and low-emission development that will achieve stabilization of greenhouse gas (GHG) concentration in the atmosphere.

Green Climate Fund

In January 2015, GGGI was accredited as an observer organization to the Green Climate Fund (GCF). The GCF was established by the Parties at the 2010 United Nations Framework Convention on Climate Change (UNFCCC) conference held in Cancun, Mexico, and designated as an operating entity of the convention's financial mechanism. GGGI supports its government partners to access project readiness funding under the GCF readiness program. As of November 2018, GGGI has supported 8 of its partner governments in accessing readiness funding, including Vanuatu, Mongolia, Papua New Guinea, Thailand, Lao PDR, Rwanda, Jordan and Indonesia.

Organisation for Economic Co-operation and Development

GGGI is a founding member of the Green Growth Knowledge Platform together with the OECD. In June 2013, GGGI was granted Official Development Assistance (ODA) eligibility status by the Organisation for Economic Co-operation and Development – Development Assistance Committee (OECD-DAC). GGGI is an observer to the OECD Development Assistance Committee Network on Environment and Development Co-operation (DAC ENVIRONET).

Multilateral Development Banks and UN Regional Commissions

At the Twenty-First Conference of the Parties to the United Nations Framework Convention on Climate Change, GGGI together with the multilateral development banks and United Nations regional commissions launched an Inclusive Green Growth Partnership. The founding members of the Partnership are GGGI, Asian Development Bank, African Development Bank, Inter-American Development Bank, United Nations Economic Commission for Africa, United Nations Economic Commission for Latin America and the Caribbean, United Nations Economic and Social Commission for Asia and the Pacific, and United Nations Economic and Social Commission for Western Asia.

Global Commission on the Economy and Climate

GGGI is a research partner for the Global Commission on the Economy and Climate's New Climate Economy project. GGGI works together with the World Resources Institute, Climate Policy Initiative, Ethiopian Development Research Institute, Indian Council for Research on International Economic Relations, London School of Economics and Political Science, Overseas Development Institute, Stockholm Environment Institute, and Tsinghua University. The Global Commission is composed of former heads of government and finance ministers, and leaders in the fields of economics, business and finance, and chaired by former President of Mexico Felipe Calderón.

Structure 

The institute's structure consists of an Assembly, a Council, a Secretariat, and an Advisory Committee.

Assembly 

The Assembly is the supreme organ of GGGI and is composed of all Member States. It meets every two years, where it elects members to the council, appoints the Director-General, and reviews progress made towards the institute's objectives. Additionally, the Assembly advises on the overall direction of the institute's work.

The Assembly elects one President and two Vice-Presidents for two-year terms to serve on its bureau. The current leadership of the Assembly is as follows:
  Ban Ki-moon, President
  Republic of Korea, Vice-President 
  Ethiopia, Vice-President

Council 

The council is the executive organ of Institute and under the guidance of the Assembly is responsible for directing the activities of GGGI. Some of its duties include: nominating new Directors-General, approving the annual work program and budget, approving audited financial statements the admission of new members to the Advisory Committee.

The Council consists of no more than seventeen members under the following terms:
 Five contributing members, elected by the Assembly for two-year terms
 Five participating members, elected by the Assembly for two-year terms
 Five experts or non-state actors, appointed by the council for two-year terms
 A permanent seat for the host country
 The Director-General

Additionally, the Council elects one Chair and two Vice-Chairs to form its bureau. The current leadership of the council is as follows:
  Ban Ki-moon, Chair
  Republic of Korea, Vice-Chair
  Ethiopia, Vice-Chair

Current members of the Council 
 Contributing members
  Australia
  Indonesia
  Norway
  Qatar
  United Kingdom
 Participating members
  Fiji
  Jordan
  Paraguay
  Rwanda
  Senegal
 Expert and non-state actors
 Mr. Ban Ki-Moon
 The Republic of Korea
 The Director-General 
 Dr. Frank Rijsberman

Secretariat 

The Secretariat is the chief operational organ of the institute. The Secretariat is led by a Director-General whose duties include: providing strategic leadership,  preparing  operational and financial documents, reporting on the implementation of the institute's activities, implementing the decisions of the Assembly and Council, and representing the GGGI externally.

The Secretariat is based in Seoul, Republic of Korea, and has operations in 24 other countries. The current Director-General is Dr. Frank Rijsberman.

Previous Directors-General

Advisory Committee 
The Advisory Committee is an advisory organ of the institute. It serves as a forum allowing for public-private cooperation on green growth, while also advising the council on the strategy and activities of the GGGI. There is no limit on the membership of the Advisory Committee.

See also

Alternative propulsion
Avoiding dangerous climate change
Carbon negative fuel
Carbon neutrality
Carbon Process Management
Coal phase out
Comparisons of life-cycle greenhouse gas emissions
Electric vehicle
Emission standard
Emissions trading
Energy policy
Environmental economics
Low-carbon building
Low Carbon Communities
Low carbon diet
Low-carbon economy
Low-carbon fuel standard
One Watt Initiative
Petroleum phase out
Sustainable development
World energy resources and consumption
Verified Carbon Standard

References

International organizations based in South Korea
Environmental organizations based in South Korea